Mouloundou may refer to: 
Mouloundou Department
Moloundou